The Piano Sonata in F major, Hob. XVI/9, L.3, also called a divertimento, was written before 1766 (perhaps in 1758) by Joseph Haydn. The 1st and 3rd movements are used as the 1st and 5th movements respectively of the Piano Trio in F major, Hob. XV/39. The Minuet of the 2nd movement is also used as the Minuet of the 4th movement of Hob. XV/39.

Structure 

The work has three movements:
I. Allegro
II. Minuet & Trio
III. Scherzo

Notable recordings 

Tom Beghin's The Virtual Haydn: Complete Works for Solo Keyboard.

Notes

References 

Haydn, Joseph. Haydn The Complete Piano Sonatas. Vol. 1. Edited by Maurice Hinson . Van 
Nuys: Alfred publishing, 1990. Note: For an authoritative text of the music see the Wiener Urtext Edition, Vienna (1966).

Jones, David Wyn. Oxford Composer Companions: Haydn. Oxford: Oxford University Press, 
2002.

External links 
Franz Joseph Haydn (1732-1809) - Sonate in F-Dur, Hob XVI:9 

Joseph Haydn, The Virtual Haydn, Tom Beghin, Naxos 8.501203, CD, 2011

1758 compositions
Piano sonatas by Joseph Haydn
Compositions in F major